White Girl is a 2008 BBC film directed by Hettie MacDonald and starring Anna Maxwell Martin, Holly Kenny, Daniel Mays, Melanie Hill, Jay Simpson, and Jade Islam. Written by Abi Morgan, it was made as part of the BBC's White Season. It portrays a white family who move from an area of Leeds that has predominantly White British inhabitants to an area of Bradford composed of inhabitants of South Asian heritage.

Cast
Anna Maxwell Martin – Debbie
Holly Kenny – Leah
Daniel Mays – Stevie
Melanie Hill – Sonya
Jay Simpson – Adam
Elise and Gabrielle Johnson – Casey
Jade Islam – Yasmin

Awards
 British Academy Television Awards 2009 – Single Drama

References

External links

2008 television films
2008 films
British television films
Films set in Leeds
Films set in Yorkshire
2000s English-language films